The minim (abbreviated min,  or ) is a unit of volume in both the imperial and U.S. customary systems of measurement.

The minim was introduced in the 1809 edition of The Pharmacopœia of the Royal College of Physicians of London as a replacement for the drop, which had previously been the smallest unit of the apothecaries' system. It was observed that the size of a drop can vary considerably depending upon the viscosity and specific gravity of the liquid. (At the time, the phenomenon of surface tension was not well understood.) The minim, on the other hand, was measured with a graduated glass tube known as a "minimometer", later known as the minim-tube. The minim-tube was a type of graduated pipette, a device invented in 1791 by François-Antoine-Henri Descroizilles.

Apothecaries' measures are fully defined in the United Kingdom's Weights and Measures Act of 1878, but the UK's 1963 Weights and Measures Act provided for the abolition of the minim, fluid scruple, and fluid drachm, all already obsolete. Actual delegalization occurred on 1 February 1971.

The use of the minim, along with other such measures, has been reduced by the adoption of the metric system, and even in the least metricated countries, pharmacy  is largely metricated and the apothecaries' system is deprecated. The unit may rarely persist in some countries in the measurement of dosages of medicine.

Definitions

References and notes

Units of volume
Customary units of measurement in the United States
Imperial units

External links 
 Unicode Miscellaneous Symbols